Aleksandr Anatolyevich Kochnev (born 21 August 1987) is a former Russian professional football player.

Club career
He played in the Russian Football National League for FC Metallurg-Kuzbass Novokuznetsk in 2007.

External links
 
 

1987 births
Living people
Russian footballers
Association football midfielders
FC Sibir Novosibirsk players
FC Novokuznetsk players
FC Chita players